Geoffrey Rhoades (1898, London - 1980) was a British painter and art teacher.

Awards
Giles Bequest Prize 1950 for his linocut "Anacreon's Tomb"

Art
Winter Afternoon, Chalk Farm (1935)
Anacreon's Tomb (Lino cut) (1950)

References

20th-century British painters
British male painters
1898 births
1980 deaths
Painters from London
19th-century British male artists
20th-century British male artists